Michael Frederick Box (born 9 June 1947) is an English musician who is the lead guitarist of rock group Uriah Heep, having previously been a member of The Stalkers and Spice, both with original Uriah Heep vocalist David Byron. He is the only member from the band's founding in 1969 who is still active with the group, and – following the 2020 deaths of Lee Kerslake and Ken Hensley – is also the last surviving member of the group's classic line-up.

Biography

Early influences 
In 2018 Mick Box said he was influenced by Les Paul and Mary Ford, Django Reinhardt, Wes Montgomery, Tal Farlow and Barney Kessel. He attributes some of these influences to his first guitar instructor because he was the second guitarist for Django Reinhardt, as well as coming from a jazz background.

When he started performing with Uriah Heep, other new bands included Black Sabbath, Deep Purple, and Led Zeppelin.

Spice 
Before establishing Uriah Heep Box's band was called Spice . The band performed from 1968 to 1969 with David Byron
and Nigel Pegrum Box said they chose that name because they didn't want to get categorised into a narrow genre. "There's lots of spices, and that was our train of thought with the name of the band" said Box in a 2021 interview. After Ken Hensley joined the members of Spice, they became Uriah Heep.

Recent activities 
Mick Box blamed the COVID-19 pandemic for preventing a 50th Anniversary Celebration, but was planning on a 52 year Celebration. He said he felt strange being in quarantine, because he was accustomed to being "on the road," and interacting with fans at concerts. He has used the time to compose songs and he produced some videos for the Lockdown Diaries.

Box has used his talent to promote the Nightingale Cancer Support Centre.

Discography

With David Byron 
Take No Prisoners – 1975

With Uriah Heep 
...Very 'Eavy ...Very 'Umble – 1970
Salisbury – 1971
Look at Yourself – 1971
Demons & Wizards – 1972
The Magician's Birthday – 1972
Live '73 – 1973
Sweet Freedom – 1973
Wonderworld – 1974
Return to Fantasy – 1975
High and Mighty – 1976
Firefly...1977
Innocent Victim...1977
Fallen Angel – 1978
Conquest – 1980
Abominog – 1982
Head First – 1983
Equator – 1985
Raging Silence – 1989
Different World – 1991
Sea of Light – 1995
Sonic Origami – 1998
Wake the Sleeper – 2008
Celebration – Forty Years of Rock – 2009
Into the Wild – 2011
Outsider – 2014
Living the Dream – 2018
Chaos & Colour – 2023

With Iris 
Lady in Black – 2002

With Spearfish 
Back for the Future – 2003

References

External links 

The Official Website of Mick Box

Uriah Heep (band) members
1947 births
Living people
English rock guitarists
English heavy metal guitarists
Lead guitarists
People from Walthamstow
Musicians from London